Euseius talinga is a species of mite in the family Phytoseiidae.

References

talinga
Articles created by Qbugbot
Animals described in 1962